Oak Ridge, Virginia may refer to:
Oak Ridge (Danville, Virginia), a historic plantation estate in Pittsylvania County
Oak Ridge, Nelson County, Virginia
Oak Ridge, Pittsylvania County, Virginia